Jordan Creek is an unincorporated community in Tillamook County, Oregon, United States. The community is along Oregon Route 6 northeast of Tillamook in the Northern Oregon Coast Range. It lies in the Tillamook State Forest at the confluence of Jordan Creek with the Wilson River.

References

Unincorporated communities in Tillamook County, Oregon
Unincorporated communities in Oregon